In physics, a quantum instrument is a mathematical abstraction of a quantum measurement, capturing both the classical and quantum outputs.  It combines the concepts of measurement and quantum operation. It can be equivalently understood as a quantum channel that takes as input a quantum system and has as its output two systems: a classical system containing the outcome of the measurement and a quantum system containing the post-measurement state.

Definition
Let  be a countable set describing the outcomes of a measurement, and let  denote a collection of trace-non-increasing completely positive maps, such that the sum of all  is trace-preserving, i.e.  for all positive operators .

Now for describing a quantum measurement by an instrument , the maps  are used to model the mapping from an input state  to the output state of a measurement conditioned on a classical measurement outcome . Therefore, the probability of measuring a specific outcome  on a state   is given by

The state after a measurement with the specific outcome  is given by

If the measurement outcomes are recorded in a classical register, whose states are modeled by a set of orthonormal projections  , then the action of an instrument  is given by a quantum channel   with

A quantum instrument is an example of a quantum operation in which an "outcome"  indicating which operator acted on the state is recorded in a classical register.  An expanded development of quantum instruments is given in quantum channel.

References 

 E. Davies, J. Lewis. An operational approach to quantum probability, Comm. Math. Phys., vol. 17, pp. 239–260, 1970.
 Distillation of secret key paper
 Another paper which uses the concept

Quantum mechanics